Lataxiena blosvillei is a species of sea snail, a marine gastropod mollusc in the family Muricidae, the murex snails or rock snails.

Description
The length of the shell attains 31.8 mm.

Distribution
This marine species occurs off Sri Lanka.

References

 Deshayes, G. P., 1830 Histoire naturelle des vers. In: Encyclopédie méthodique, vol. II(1), p. 256 pp
 Leung KF. & Morton B. (2003). Effects of long-term anthropogenic perturbations on three subtidal epibenthic molluscan communities in Hong Kong. In: Morton B, editor. Proceedings of an International Workshop Reunion Conference, Hong Kong: Perspectives on Marine Environment Change in Hong Kong and Southern China, 1977–2001. Hong Kong University Press, Hong Kong. pp 655–717

External links
 Reeve, L. A. (1847-1848). Monograph of the genus Fusus. In: Conchologia Iconica, or, illustrations of the shells of molluscous animals, vol. 4, pls 1-21 and unpaginated text. L. Reeve & Co., London

blosvillei
Gastropods described in 1832